M. roseus may refer to:
 Maoricolpus roseus, a sea snail species found only in New Zealand
 Micrococcus roseus, a gram positive bacterium species
 Roseomonas rosea, formerly Muricoccus roseus, a gram negative bacterium species

See also
 Roseus (disambiguation)